Cole Young Sulser (born March 12, 1990) is an American professional baseball pitcher for the Arizona Diamondbacks of Major League Baseball (MLB). He made his MLB debut with the Tampa Bay Rays in 2019. He has also played for the Baltimore Orioles and Miami Marlins.

Amateur career
Sulser graduated from Ramona High School in Ramona, California, in 2008, where he played baseball all four years. Undrafted out of high school, he attended Dartmouth College. He earned two bachelor's degrees at Dartmouth: in engineering sciences with public policy and mechanical engineering.

Sulser played college baseball for the Dartmouth Big Green. As a sophomore, Sulser set a Big Green record posting an 8–0 win–loss record, a Big Green single-season record for wins, and led the Ivy League in strikeouts. He was named to the All-Ivy League team in 2011, his junior year, but injured an elbow ligament and underwent Tommy John surgery. Though he missed his entire senior year, his teammates chose him as their captain. Sulser was granted a redshirt for the 2012 season, a rarity in the Ivy League, and he pitched for Dartmouth in 2013, again being named co-captain and making the All-Ivy League team. His 20 wins over his career were the second-most in Dartmouth history.

Professional career

Cleveland Indians
The Cleveland Indians selected Sulser in the 25th round of the 2013 MLB draft. Sulser played for the Mahoning Valley Scrappers of the Class A-Short Season New York-Penn League in 2013, going 3–2 with a 1.83 earned run average (ERA) in 54 innings pitched. He split the 2014 season between the Carolina Mudcats of the Class A-Advanced Carolina League and the Akron RubberDucks of the Class AA Eastern League, going a combined 4–14 with a 5.43 ERA over 136 innings. Sulser had his second Tommy John surgery in 2015, and missed the entire season.

Sulser split the 2016 season between the Lynchburg Hillcats of the Carolina League, Akron, and the Columbus Clippers of the Class AAA International League, going a combined 2–5 with a 4.34 ERA in 63 innings. Sulser split the 2017 season between Akron and Columbus, going 3–1 with a 2.70 ERA in 63 innings. In winter baseball after the season, Sulser played for the Estrellas Orientales of the Dominican Winter League. In 2018, he again split the season between Akron and Columbus, going 8–4 with a 3.86 ERA in  innings with 95 strikeouts.

Tampa Bay Rays
On December 13, 2018, Cleveland traded Sulser to the Tampa Bay Rays in a three–team trade in which the Rays also acquired Yandy Díaz for Jake Bauers, and the Seattle Mariners acquired Edwin Encarnación from the Indians for Carlos Santana. Sulser spent the 2019 minor league season with the Durham Bulls of the International League, going 6–3 with a 3.27 ERA in 66 innings with 89 strikeouts.

The Rays selected Sulser's contract and promoted him to the major leagues on September 2, 2019. He made his major league debut with Tampa Bay on September 6 against the Toronto Blue Jays. He was designated for assignment when the Rays activated Yandy Díaz from the 60-day injured list on September 29.

Baltimore Orioles
Sulser was claimed off waivers by the Baltimore Orioles two days later on October 1, replacing Chandler Shepherd who had been outrighted the previous day. In 2020 for the Orioles, Sulser pitched to a 5.56 ERA with 19 strikeouts and a 1–5 record over 19 appearances. Sulser had a breakout season in 2021 as he went 5–4 with eight saves, a 2.70 ERA and 73 strikeouts in  innings.

Miami Marlins
On April 3, 2022, the Orioles traded Sulser along with Tanner Scott to the Miami Marlins in exchange for a draft pick, two minor leaguers, Antonio Velez and Kevin Guerrero, and a player to be named later. (On June 3, Baltimore acquired minor league RHP Yaqui Rivera from Miami as the player to be named later).

Arizona Diamondbacks
On November 8, 2022, Sulser was claimed off waivers by the Arizona Diamondbacks. On November 18, he signed a contract for 2023, avoiding arbitration.

Personal life
Sulser grew up in Santa Ysabel, California, located in the San Diego mountains. However he attended elementary, middle and high school in Ramona, where his mother was a teacher. Sulser started playing baseball at age four and played Ramona Pony Baseball until age 14. He also played on several local travel teams. He attended Ramona High School where he played baseball, was ASB President and served as a peer mentor. His father worked as a general building contractor as well as helped coach many of Sulser's youth teams.

His younger brother, Beau Sulser, also plays professional baseball in the Baltimore Orioles organization, after a college career at Dartmouth. Sulser's younger sister, Tiffany, serves in the United States Coast Guard. He is married to model and actress, Dana Sulser which he met in 2016 while playing in Double A for the Akron Rubber Ducks with the Cleveland Indians organization. In 2020, the two co wrote and illustrated a children's book called "Benny The Pitcher."

References

External links

Dartmouth Big Green bio

1990 births
Living people
People from Ramona, San Diego County, California
Baseball players from California
Major League Baseball pitchers
Tampa Bay Rays players
Baltimore Orioles players
Miami Marlins players
Dartmouth Big Green baseball players
Mahoning Valley Scrappers players
Carolina Mudcats players
Lynchburg Hillcats players
Akron RubberDucks players
Columbus Clippers players
Durham Bulls players
Estrellas Orientales players
American expatriate baseball players in the Dominican Republic